The Children's Theatre Company is a regional theater established in 1965 in Minneapolis, Minnesota, specializing in plays for families, young audiences and the very young. The theater is the largest theater for multigenerational audiences in the United States and is the recipient of 2003 Tony Award for Outstanding Regional Theatre. The November 2, 2004, edition of Time magazine named the company as the top theater for children in the U.S. 

Children’s Theatre Company operates two theatre spaces including the UnitedHealth Group Stage which seats 747 and the mixed-use Cargill Stage which seats up to 300. Architect Michael Graves designed the expansion for the theater in 2003 nearly doubling the production shops and adding the Cargill stage and lobby space.

History 
The founding is credited to John Clark Donahue and Beth Linnerson under the name The Moppet Players from 1961-1965. It became the education department of the Minneapolis Institute of Arts from 1965-75 when it became a 501c3 non-profit organization. Many productions were adaptations from children's literature including Pippi Longstocking, The 500 Hats of Bartholomew Cubbins, Cinderella, How The Grinch Stole Christmas, A Year with Frog and Toad and Alice in Wonderland that have been in the company's repertoire for decades.. Actors in productions are a mix of adult and young adult performers. Recent plays and musicals produced are written by leading playwrights that include wholly original stories and adaptations of books by popular authors such as Matt De La Peña, Jeff Kinney, J.R.R. Tolkien, Kate DiCamillo, and Jacqueline Woodson.

The programs began operating from space donated in a restaurant before moving to an abandoned fire station donated when the troupe affiliated itself with the social service agency Pillsbury-Waite Settlement House.  It is now located next to the Minneapolis Institute of Arts.

John Clark Donahue was fired 1984 after pleading guilty to sexual abuse of three male minor students. Donahue was sentenced to a year in prison and 15 years' probation during which time he was to completely disengage himself from the Children's Theatre Company.

On December 1, 2015, two former students from the 1970s and early 80s filed civil lawsuits against the theater claiming abuse by Donohue and Jason McLean, a former actor. Additional suits were filed under the Minnesota Child Victims Act.  which expired in May 2016. Donahue died of cancer in March 2019.

On November 1, 2019, Children's Theatre Company announced the settlement of all 16 lawsuits. Children's Theatre Company's board of directors also approved a contribution to a newly created Survivors Fund in the amount of $500,000 requested by the survivors.

Leadership 
The theater was founded by John Clark Donahue along with John Burton Davidson, Shirley Diercks, Martha Pierce Boesing and Beth Leinerson. Jon Cranny served as the theater's second artistic director from 1984 until 1997, when Peter C. Brosius became the theater's third artistic director alongside the theater's managing directors: Theresa Eyring (1999–2007), Gabriella Callichio (2007–11), Tim Jennings (2011–15) and Kimberly Motes (16-present). Brosius was the longest serving Artistic Director in the history of Children’s Theatre Company.

New Plays/Notable People 
In 1998, under Brosius' leadership, the theater established a new play laboratory, which works with leading playwrights, composers, designers, and directors. Over 200 new plays have been developed and the majority have had their world premieres at Children’s Theatre Company.

The theater has partnered with other large theatre producers such as Kevin McCollum, Buena Vista Theatricals, Universal Theatrical Group, and other leading regional theaters such as The Old Globe Theatre, New Victory Theater, Alliance Theatre, Arena Stage, and others. The original production of A Year with Frog and Toad transferred to Broadway and was nominated for three Tony Awards. The theater's production of A Year with Frog and Toad,  completed a run at the Cort Theatre on Broadway in June 2003. The theater commissioned and developed the production Diary of a Wimpy Kid the Musical together with Broadway producer Kevin McCollum and Buena Vista Theatrical and Jeff Kinney, author of the book series. It had its world premiere in 2016 and a subsequent production in 2022. 

In 2021, Children’s Theatre Company, Penumbra (Saint Paul, MN), Ma-Yi Theater Company (New York City, NY), Latino Theater Company (Los Angeles, CA), and Native Voices at the Autry (Los Angeles, CA) announced a landmark partnership that received a $1.5 million grant from The Andrew W. Mellon Foundation to create Generation Now. The program will commission and develop 16 new plays by Black, Indigenous, Latinx, and Asian American Pacific Islander writers for multigenerational audiences. The output of Generation Now promises to “radically expand the inclusiveness of each theatre, expand the canon of work produced for multigenerational audiences, and create a model of transformative partnership for the theatre field.” 

The theater will be premiering a brand new musical version of An American Tail the Musical in 2023, based on the Universal Pictures/Amblin Entertainment animated film from 1989, with Universal Theatrical Group. 

Notable playwrights include:

 Itamar Moses
 Cheryl L. West
 Philip Dawkins
 Nilo Cruz
 Jeffrey Hatcher
 Kia Corthron
 Naomi Iizuka
 Barry Kornhauser
 Greg Banks
 Willie Reale
 Jerome Hairston
 Lloyd Suh
 Kari Margolis
 Larissa Fasthorse

Notable composers include:

 Lamont Dozier, Paris Ray Dozier
 Victor Zupanc
 Michael Mahler
 Alan Schmuckler
 David Mallamud

Notable actors include: 

 Laura Osnes
 Adam Shankman
 Lea Thompson
 Ann Kim
 Francesca Curran
 Ryan McCartan
 Vincent Kartheiser
 Josh Hartnett
 Alix Kendall
 Dean Holt
 Autumn Ness
 Reed Sigmund
 Rajane Katurah
 Mark Linn-Baker

2022–2023 Season 

 Circus Abyssinia: Tulu, Co-created, directed, and produced by Mehari “Bibi” Tesfamariam and Binyam “Bichu” Shimellis
 Carmela Full of Wishes, by Alvaro Saar Rios, from the book by Matt de la Peña, illustrated by Christian Robinson, directed by Tatyana-Marie Carlo
 Dr. Seuss’s How the Grinch Stole Christmas, based on the book by Dr. Seuss, Book and lyrics by Timothy Mason, music by Mel Marvin, directed by Peter C. Brosius 
 Locomotion, written and adapted by book author, Jacqueline Woodson, directed by Talvin Wilks
 Corduroy by Barry Kornhauser, based on the book by Don Freeman, directed by Peter C. Brosius
 An American Tail the Musical by Itamar Moses, based on the Universal Pictures/Amblin Entertainment animated film, music and lyrics by Michael Mahler and Alan Schmuckler, directed by Taibi Magar, in association with Universal Theatrical Group

See Children’s Theatre Company production history for previous seasons.

See also
Plays for Young Audiences

References

Sources

 
 

 Schuessler, Jennifer. Wimpy Kid Musical to have Premiere in Minneapolis (https://artsbeat.blogs.nytimes.com/2015/02/16/wimpy-kid-musical-to-have-premiere-in-minneapolis/) February 2015

External links
 
 
 Children's Theatre Company A documentary produced by Minnesota Originals for Twin Cities PBS
 Interview with children's author/artist Tomie dePaola and playwright Constance Congdon about their collaboration on the 1990 CTC play Mother Goose, interviewed by Gretchen Wronka, ALL ABOUT KIDS! TV Series #43 (1990)
 Interview with author Barry Lopez about the adaptation of his book Crow and Weasel for a CTC play, interviewed by Gretchen Wronka, ALL ABOUT KIDS! TV Series #157 (1994)
 PBS Newshour segment, “Minneapolis-based Children’s Theatre Company debuts play about race and policing” (2022)
 Broadway World, “First Look at Newly Updated Diary of a Wimpy Kid the Musical” (2022)

1961 establishments in Minnesota
Theatre companies in Minneapolis
Theatre in Minneapolis
Tony Award winners
Regional theatre in the United States
Michael Graves buildings
Children's theatre
Performing groups established in 1961